Jason Paul Collins (born December 2, 1978) is an American former professional basketball player who was a center for 13 seasons in the National Basketball Association (NBA). He played college basketball for the Stanford Cardinal, where he was an All-American in 2000–01. Collins was selected by the Houston Rockets as the 18th overall pick in the 2001 NBA draft. He went on to play for the New Jersey Nets, Memphis Grizzlies, Minnesota Timberwolves, Atlanta Hawks, Boston Celtics, Washington Wizards and Brooklyn Nets.

After the 2012–13 NBA season concluded, Collins publicly came out as gay. He became a free agent and did not play again until February 2014, when he signed with the Nets and became the first publicly gay athlete to play in any of four major North American pro sports leagues. In April 2014, Collins was featured on the cover of Time Magazine's "100 Most Influential People in the World".

Early life
Collins was born in Los Angeles, California, in the Northridge neighborhood. He was born eight minutes ahead of his twin brother Jarron, who also became an NBA player.

Both brothers graduated from Harvard-Westlake School in Los Angeles. He and Jarron won two California Interscholastic Federation state titles during their four-year careers with a combined record of 123–10. Collins broke the California career rebounding record with 1,500. Collins was backed up by Jason Segel, who USA Today opined might have ended up being the most famous player from the team.

College career
Collins played at Stanford University with brother Jarron for the Cardinal in the Pacific-10 Conference (Pac-10). In 2001, Collins was named to All-Pac-10 first team, and the National Association of Basketball Coaches (NABC) voted him to their third-team All-American team.

He finished his college career ranked first in Stanford history for field goal percentage (.608) and third in blocked shots (89).

Professional career

New Jersey Nets (2001–2008)
As a rookie along with Richard Jefferson, Collins played a significant role in the New Jersey Nets' first-ever NBA Finals berth in 2002 against the Los Angeles Lakers. During this Finals appearance, Collins acknowledged that he is not really 7 feet tall as he has been listed since his junior year of college. He was measured 6 ft 10¼ in at the 2001 NBA combine.

In the 2002–03 NBA season Collins took over the starting center role for the Nets and helped the franchise back to the NBA Finals. During that season, Collins averaged 5.7 points and 4.5 rebounds per game. Prior to the 2004–05 season, he signed a $25 million contract extension with New Jersey for five more years.

Memphis Grizzlies (2008)
On February 4, 2008, Collins was traded along with cash considerations to the Memphis Grizzlies for Stromile Swift.

Minnesota Timberwolves (2008–2009) 
On June 26, 2008, Collins was dealt to the Minnesota Timberwolves in an eight-player deal involving Kevin Love and O. J. Mayo.

Atlanta Hawks (2009–2012) 
Collins signed with the Atlanta Hawks on September 2, 2009. Collins re-signed with the Hawks in the 2010 offseason. In 2010–11, the fifth-seeded Hawks defeated the fourth-seeded Orlando Magic as Collins slowed the Magic's dominant center, Dwight Howard. After Game 4 in the series, then-Orlando coach Stan Van Gundy called Collins' play "the best defense on [Howard] all year".

Boston Celtics (2012–2013) 

On July 31, 2012, Collins signed a contract with the Boston Celtics.

Washington Wizards (2013) 
On February 21, 2013, Collins and Leandro Barbosa were traded to the Washington Wizards in exchange for Jordan Crawford.

On April 29, 2013, after the season had already concluded, Collins publicly came out as gay, becoming the first active male athlete from one of the four major North American professional team sports to publicly do so. Collins became a free agent in July 2013, and stated that he intended to pursue another contract. He was not invited by any team to training camp, but he worked out at his home waiting for an opportunity.

Brooklyn Nets (2014) 
On February 23, 2014, Collins signed a 10-day contract to rejoin the Nets, who had since moved to Brooklyn. Nets coach Jason Kidd, who became good friends with Collins while teammates in New Jersey from 2001 to 2008, was an advocate of signing Collins. Collins played 11 minutes that night against the Lakers at the Staples Center, becoming the first publicly gay athlete to play in any of the four major North American professional sports leagues. Collins wore jersey number 46 (the only number the team had available at the time) in his first game of the season, but planned to wear No. 98—the same number he wore with Boston and Washington—going forward. Collins chose to wear No. 98 in honor of Matthew Shepard, whose 1998 murder was widely reported as a hate crime and ultimately led to the passage of the Matthew Shepard and James Byrd Jr. Hate Crimes Prevention Act. Collins' jersey rose to the top spot for sales in the NBA's online shop, and the NBA announced that proceeds from the sales, as well as proceeds from auctions of Collins' autographed game-worn jerseys, would benefit the Matthew Shepard Foundation, and the Gay, Lesbian & Straight Education Network (GLSEN).

On March 5, 2014, Collins signed a second 10-day contract with the Nets. On March 15, 2014, Collins signed with the Nets for the rest of the season.

On November 19, 2014, Collins announced his retirement from professional basketball after 13 seasons in the NBA.

Player profile
Collins had low career averages in the NBA of 3.6 points, 3.7 rebounds, 0.5 blocks, and 41 percent shooting from the field, and never averaged more than seven points or seven rebounds in a season. However, the basketball analytics community valued his defense through measurements not typically found in a boxscore. Collins was a physical player defending the post, boxed out well, and excelled at setting screens. He was precise in executing coaches' defensive strategies, and he read the opponents' movements well and communicated on defense. He also had a reputation for being a team leader, and earned consistent praise for his professionalism and intelligence on the court.

Personal life
Collins was in an eight-year relationship with former WNBA center Carolyn Moos, and the two were engaged to be married, but Collins called off the wedding in 2009.

Coming out
In the cover story of the May 6, 2013 issue of Sports Illustrated, a first person story by Collins with journalist Franz Lidz, and posted on the magazine's website on April 29, 2013, he came out as gay, becoming the first active male athlete from one of the four major North American professional team sports to publicly do so. He wrote that he wished to maintain his privacy in regard to specific details of his personal life, and that he is not in a relationship. Collins also said a "notorious antigay hate crime", the murder of Matthew Shepard in 1998, led him to choose "98" for his jersey number, in Shepard's honor. Collins called the number "a statement to myself, my family and my friends."

Following his announcement, Collins has received high praise and support for deciding to publicly reveal that he is gay. Fellow NBA star Kobe Bryant praised his decision, as did others from around the league, including NBA commissioner David Stern. President Barack Obama, First Lady Michelle Obama, former president Bill Clinton, and Collins' corporate sponsor Nike were also among those offering their praise and support for Collins. However, ESPN basketball analyst Chris Broussard stated that he did not believe that Collins can "live an openly homosexual lifestyle" and be a Christian, but thought that Collins "displayed bravery with his announcement". Collins, a Christian, responded by saying "This is all about tolerance and acceptance and America is the best country in the world because we're all entitled to our opinions and beliefs but we don't have to agree. And obviously I don't agree with his statement." The Guardian called it significant for LGBT acceptance "as professional sports had long been seen as the final frontier." Given the interest in major league team sports in the United States, The Christian Science Monitor wrote that Collins' announcement was "likely to put wind in the sails of this trend" of acceptance of gay rights in U.S. public opinion. Former tennis player Martina Navratilova, who came out as a lesbian in 1981, called Collins a "game-changer" for team sports, which she referred to as one of the last areas where homophobia remained.

Collins' former fiancée, Carolyn Moos, expressed conflicted feelings and said she only learned Collins was gay shortly before the Sports Illustrated cover story.

On the day it was released, the Sports Illustrated story drew a record 3.7 million visitors to the magazine's website, SI.com.

The New York Times called his 2014 signing with Brooklyn "perhaps basketball’s most celebrated and scrutinized 10-day contract." His No. 98 jersey became the top seller on the NBA's online store.

Since June 2014, Collins has been in a relationship with producer Brunson Green.

NBA career statistics

Regular season

|-
| style="text-align:left;"|
| style="text-align:left;"|New Jersey
| 77 || 9 || 18.3 || .421 || .500 || .701 || 3.9 || 1.1 || .4 || .6 || 4.5
|-
| style="text-align:left;"|
| style="text-align:left;"|New Jersey
| 81 || 66 || 23.5 || .414 || .000 || .763 || 4.5 || 1.1 || .6 || .5 || 5.7
|-
| style="text-align:left;"|
| style="text-align:left;"|New Jersey
| 78 || 78 || 28.5 || .424 || .000 || .739 || 5.1 || 2.0 || .9 || .7 || 5.9
|-
| style="text-align:left;"|
| style="text-align:left;"|New Jersey
| 80 || 80 || 31.8 || .412 || .333 || .656 || 6.1 || 1.3 || .9 || .9 || 6.4
|-
| style="text-align:left;"|
| style="text-align:left;"|New Jersey
| 71 || 70 || 26.7 || .397 || .250 || .512 || 4.8 || 1.0 || .6 || .6 || 3.6
|-
| style="text-align:left;"|
| style="text-align:left;"|New Jersey
| 80 || 78 || 23.1 || .364 || .000 || .465 || 4.0 || .6 || .5 || .5 || 2.1
|-
| style="text-align:left;"|
| style="text-align:left;"|New Jersey
| 43 || 23 || 15.9 || .426 ||  || .389 || 2.1 || .4 || .3 || .2 || 1.4
|-
| style="text-align:left;"|
| style="text-align:left;"|Memphis
| 31 || 3 || 15.7 || .508 || .000 || .526 || 2.9 || .2 || .4 || .5 || 2.6
|-
| style="text-align:left;"|
| style="text-align:left;"|Minnesota
| 31 || 22 || 13.6 || .314 ||  || .464 || 2.3 || .4 || .3 || .4 || 1.8
|-
| style="text-align:left;"|
| style="text-align:left;"|Atlanta
| 24 || 0 || 4.8 || .348 || .000 || .000 || .6 || .2 || .1 || .1 || .7
|-
| style="text-align:left;"|
| style="text-align:left;"|Atlanta
| 49 || 28 || 12.1 || .479 || 1.000 || .659 || 2.1 || .4 || .2 || .2 || 2.0
|-
| style="text-align:left;"|
| style="text-align:left;"|Atlanta
| 30 || 10 || 10.3 || .400 ||  || .467 || 1.6 || .3 || .1 || .1 || 1.3
|-
| style="text-align:left;"|
| style="text-align:left;"|Boston
| 32 || 7 || 10.3 || .348 ||  || .700 || 1.6 || .2 || .3 || .2 || 1.2
|-
| style="text-align:left;"|
| style="text-align:left;"|Washington
| 6 || 2 || 9.0 || .167 ||  || 1.000 || 1.3 || .3 || .3 || .7 || .7
|-
| style="text-align:left;"|
| style="text-align:left;"|Brooklyn
| 22 || 1 || 7.8 || .458 || .000 || .750 || 0.9 || .2 || .4 || .0 || 1.1
|- class="sortbottom"
| style="text-align:center;" colspan="2"|Career
| 735 || 477 || 20.4 || .411 || .206 || .647 || 3.7 || .9 || .5 || .5 || 3.6

Playoffs

|-
| style="text-align:left;"|2002
| style="text-align:left;"|New Jersey
| 17 || 0 || 13.4 || .364 ||  || .658 || 2.4 || .4 || .3 || .4 || 2.9
|-
| style="text-align:left;"|2003
| style="text-align:left;"|New Jersey
| 20 || 20 || 26.5 || .363 || .000 || .836 || 6.3 || .9 || .7 || .6 || 5.9
|-
| style="text-align:left;"|2004
| style="text-align:left;"|New Jersey
| 11 || 11 || 24.2 || .368 ||  || .750 || 4.0 || 1.5 || .3 || .9 || 3.6
|-
| style="text-align:left;"|2005
| style="text-align:left;"|New Jersey
| 4 || 4 || 32.0 || .235 ||  || .375 || 6.5 || .3 || .5 || .0 || 2.8
|-
| style="text-align:left;"|2006
| style="text-align:left;"|New Jersey
| 11 || 11 || 27.5 || .360 ||  || .591 || 5.0 || .3 || .5 || .2 || 2.8
|-
| style="text-align:left;"|2007
| style="text-align:left;"|New Jersey
| 12 || 12 || 27.4 || .571 ||  || .364 || 3.3 || .2 || .6 || .3 || 2.3
|-
| style="text-align:left;"|2010
| style="text-align:left;"|Atlanta
| 3 || 0 || 3.3 || .600 ||  ||  || 1.7 || .0 || .0 || .0 || 2.0
|-
| style="text-align:left;"|2011
| style="text-align:left;"|Atlanta
| 12 || 9 || 13.2 || .643 ||  || .375 || 1.4 || .1 || .4 || .3 || 1.8
|-
| style="text-align:left;"|2012
| style="text-align:left;"|Atlanta
| 5 || 4 || 17.0 || .545 ||  ||  || 2.4 || .0 || .2 || .0 || 2.4
|- class="sortbottom"
| style="text-align:center;" colspan="2"|Career
| 95 || 71 || 21.4 || .400 || .000 || .677 || 3.8 || .5 || .4 || .4 || 3.3

Awards
On August 2, 2013, Collins was among the first class of inductees into the National Gay and Lesbian Sports Hall of Fame.

See also

 Michael Sam
 Gareth Thomas
 Homosexuality in sports
 Homosexuality in sports in the United States
 List of lesbian, gay, bisexual, and transgender sportspeople

References

External links

 Stanford Cardinal bio
 

1978 births
Living people
African-American basketball players
African-American Christians
All-American college men's basketball players
Basketball players from Los Angeles
Boston Celtics players
Brooklyn Nets players
Centers (basketball)
Gay sportsmen
Harvard-Westlake School alumni
Houston Rockets draft picks
Identical twins
LGBT African Americans
LGBT basketball players
LGBT Christians
LGBT people from California
American LGBT sportspeople
McDonald's High School All-Americans
Memphis Grizzlies players
New Jersey Nets players
Parade High School All-Americans (boys' basketball)
People from Northridge, Los Angeles
Stanford Cardinal men's basketball players
American twins
Twin sportspeople
American men's basketball players
21st-century African-American sportspeople
20th-century African-American sportspeople
Inductees of the National Gay and Lesbian Sports Hall of Fame